Polar Bears is a play by British writer Mark Haddon first produced by the Donmar Warehouse in London. Following previews from  1 April 2010, the play opened on 6 April 2010 where it ran until 22 May. The world premier production was directed by Jamie Lloyd. The German Oldenburgisches Staatstheater staged the play in 2012 under direction of K.D. Schmidt

Original Cast

 Sandy – Paul Hilton
 John – Richard Coyle
 Kay – Jodhi May
 Margaret –  Celia Imrie
 Jesus – David Leon
 Girl – Skye Bennett/Alice Sykes

References

External links
Production Listing

2010 plays
British plays